The Council for Coordinating the Reforms Front or the Reformist Front Coordination Council is the umbrella organization, coalition and council of main political groups within the Iranian reform movement. Since 2015, it is overseen by the Reformists' Supreme Council for Policy-making.

Formation 
On 13 November 1999, eighteen groups came together to form the "Council for coordinating of 2nd of Khordad Front" with the aim of laying down a unified reformist strategy. The coalitions's namesake, 2nd of Khordad, corresponds to 23 May on the Iranian calendar, is the day of Mohammed Khatami's landslide victory in the 1997 presidential election. The 18 groups were later nicknamed "2nd of Khordad Front G-18".

Loose coalition in reform era 
The coalition was able to gain a supermajority in the Iranian Parliament election in 2000 and won almost all 30 seats in the most important constituency, Tehran. However, the coalition was "loose". While different groups of the coalition pursued slightly different priorities, on the whole they supported Mohammad Khatami's reforms.

Despite reformists winning all 15 seats of City Council of Tehran in 1999, clash and disagreements between councilors of Executives Party, Participation Front and Solidarity Party gradually reached to the point that the council was dissolved by Ministry of Interior, two months remaining to the 2003 elections. Council for coordinating 2nd of Khordad Front declared that it is not supporting any of the incumbent councilors in Tehran, making an issue of compromise on a unified electoral list. The member groups failed to form an alliance and every group endorsed its own candidates, with more than 10 reformist electoral lists issued. They reformists had a major defeat, losing all seats to the principlist Alliance of Builders of Islamic Iran and Mahmoud Ahmadinejad became Mayor of Tehran.

After many of the coalition's candidates were disqualified for the 2004 parliamentary elections by the Guardian council and reformist MPs held a sit-in in the Parliament, on January 31, 2004, the council declared it "will not participate in the election" and principlists won the election.

In the 2005 Iranian presidential election, reformists were unable to put forward a coalition candidate based on consensus. Executives supported Akbar Hashemi Rafsanjani and Mojahedin endorsed the Participation Front candidate Mostafa Moeen. Association of Combatant Clerics' secretary-general Mehdi Karroubi and Mohsen Mehralizadeh were other candidates supported by various reformist groups. With Mahmoud Ahmadinejad winning the election in run-off, the reformists lost another office to principlists.

Off the power 
In 2006, two elections were held simultaneously: Assembly of Experts and local elections. The council reached a coalition electoral list; however, newly founded reformist National Trust Party led by Mehdi Karroubi decided to issue its own list and endorsed some principlist candidates for Assembly of Experts.

In the 2008 parliamentary election, despite many reformists were disqualified, the front compromised to support a shared list of candidates, named "Reformists Coalition". National Trust Party endorsed its own candidates again.

Reformists were defeated in all three elections.

Green movement 
In the 2009 Iranian presidential election, the council released a statement announcing its support for Mir Hossein Mousavi.

With the protests to the election results ongoing, the council called for nonviolent protests against the government. For the anniversary of the Iranian revolution, they issued a statement, saying "We will show all of the small-minded people who sit on the thrones as rulers, and label any opposition as tools of foreign enemies, the fate of single-voiced [autocratic] systems and establishments ... We come to scream on behalf of the political prisoners, most of whom were present in the 1357 [1979] revolution and tell them [the authorities] that in lieu of imprisonments and violence against the people, you must return to the fundamentals and the original values".

Post-protests crackdown 

The aftermath of poll protests trial, Iranian reform movement was put under pressure by the government. In September 2010, a court declared that two leading parties of the coalition, Islamic Iran Participation Front and Mojahedin of the Islamic Revolution Organization are dissolved and banned. The two parties, alongside Office for Strengthening Unity, have no attended the council sessions ever since due to pressures.

In December 2011, Mohammad Khatami said "When all signs indicate that we must not participate in this election (Iranian legislative election 2012), participation in the election is meaningless." Meanwhile, the council announced that it has no hope that the election would be held freely and fairly, so they would not be participating in the election, "not to present a unified list [of candidates] and not to support anyone [in the race]." Despite the decision, a member groups including Democracy Party, Islamic Labour Party and Worker House decided to run for the elections outside the council. While major reformists position was interpreted as an "election boycott" by some, Mohammad Khatami unexpectedly cast his vote in a small rural district of Damavand despite the fact he lives in Tehran, to "keep the windows to reformism open."

In the 2013 Iranian presidential election, the council endorsed Hassan Rouhani, after persuasion of Mohammad Reza Aref to withdraw via Mohammad Khatami. With Rouhani taking the office, appointment of some reformist figures in his cabinet offered the reformist camp a lifeline.
In the 2013 local elections, the council made up the "Reformists Coalition" list, including moderate reformists and some 'not-so-familiar names' for the City Council of Tehran. The results showed a swing towards reformist candidates nationwide, and in Tehran they won 13 seats out of 31.

Membership 
The council includes political parties as well as less formal groups and organizations. Presidency of the council is a rotating position between all the member parties.

References 

Political party alliances in Iran
Reformist political groups in Iran
1999 establishments in Iran